Elena Cotta (born 19 August 1931) is an Italian stage, film and television actress.

Life and career 
Born in Milan, at a young age Cotta won a scholarship to attend the Accademia Nazionale di Arte Drammatica Silvio D'Amico;  after just one year she quit the Academy to enter the stage company "La compagnia dei giovani".  In 1975, she founded her own company together with her husband, Carlo Alighiero.

Cotta made her film debut in 1951, in Miracolo a Viggiù. In 2000, she was nominated as Best Supporting Actress at AFI award and FCCA Award for her performance in Kate Woods' Looking for Alibrandi. In 2013, at 82 years old, she won the Volpi Cup for Best Actress for her performance in A Street in Palermo, in which she played an old and stubborn Albanian woman.

Partial filmography 
 The Legend of the Piave (1952)
 Your Hands on My Body (1970)
 Looking for Alibrandi (2000)
 The Last Fashion Show (2011)
 A Street in Palermo (2013)
 Loro (2018)
 The Man Without Gravity (2019)
 Yara (2021)

References

External links 
 

1931 births
Living people
Accademia Nazionale di Arte Drammatica Silvio D'Amico alumni
Actresses from Milan
Italian film actresses
Italian stage actresses
Italian television actresses
Volpi Cup for Best Actress winners